Colonel Zdzisław Żurawski (born November 23, 1954 in Bielawa) is a Polish Army officer.

Colonel Żurawski was commander of the special forces unit "GROM" (Thunder) from September 17, 1999 to May 26, 2000.

References

Polish Army officers
Living people
1954 births
People from Bielawa